Kåre Dæhlen (23 October 1926 – 23 May 2020) was a Norwegian diplomat.

He is a cand.philol. by education, and started working for the Norwegian Ministry of Foreign Affairs in 1954. He served as the Norwegian ambassador to Greece from 1974 to 1976, to Poland from 1981 to 1986, to India from 1986 to 1990 and to Austria from 1990 to 1994.

References

1926 births
2020 deaths
Norwegian civil servants
Ambassadors of Norway to Greece
Ambassadors of Norway to Poland
Ambassadors of Norway to India
Ambassadors of Norway to Bhutan
Ambassadors of Norway to Austria